Hedley Thomas is an Australian investigative journalist and author, who has won seven Walkley Awards, two of which are Gold Walkleys.

Personal life
Thomas is married and lives in Brisbane. He has two children. In 2002 Thomas and his family were victims of a death threat and a drive-by shooting.

Career
Soon after completing high school, Thomas started his career as a newspaper copy boy for the Gold Coast Bulletin in 1984.

After nine months as a copy boy he started a journalism cadetship at the Gold Coast Bulletin, then in 1988 moved to The Courier-Mail in Brisbane. After a year, he moved to London as a foreign correspondent for News Limited Australia for two years. As a 22-year-old journalist there he covered historic events such as the fall of the Berlin wall and the Romanian Revolution.

Thomas returned to The Courier-Mail in late 1991, working there for 18 months. Thomas then moved to become the News Editor at the Hong Kong Standard for six months, before moving to the South China Morning Post in late 1993. There Thomas served in a variety of roles, including Senior Reporter, Deputy Features Editor, and Senior Writer.

In 1999 Thomas returned to Brisbane and The Courier-Mail.

In 2005 he won a Walkley award for a series of articles on Bundaberg Director of surgery Jayant Patel, which he later used a base for the non-fiction book Sick to Death, published in 2007. The book also won the Queensland Premiers Literary Award for "Literary Work Advancing Public Debate".

In 2006 Thomas moved to the Brisbane bureau of The Australian, and in 2007 won a Gold Walkley for a series highlighting the flawed police pursuit of Mohamed Haneef, an innocent doctor accused of being a terrorist. After winning the award, Thomas left journalism in early 2008 to work in the resources sector, with a role in communications, investor and government relations.

He returned to journalism and The Australian around 2010, notably covering aspects of the AWU affair during 2012.

Thomas won a second Gold Walkley in 2018, along with producer Slade Gibson, for podcast series The Teacher's Pet, a 14-episode investigation of the unsolved disappearance of Sydney mother Lynette Dawson in 1982. , the podcast series was downloaded 28 million times, and was the only Australian podcast to hit the number one spot in the US, the UK, Canada and New Zealand.

He was inducted into the Melbourne Press Clubs Media hall of fame in November 2018.

In 2022, following a guilty verdict in September in the murder trial of Lynette Dawson's former husband, Chris Dawson, Thomas received the Sir Keith Murdoch Award for his work on the podcast series.

Awards
Awards include:

 1999 Walkley for Best Investigative Writing (with Paul Whittaker) for exposing the "Net Bet affair"
2003 Walkley for Best Print Feature, "Court in Crisis" on Di Fingleton, jailed Chief Magistrate of Queensland
2005 Walkley for Best Print News story, "Exposing a Sick System" regarding Dr Jayant Patel, Bundaberg Director of Surgery
2005 Sir Keith Murdoch Award, for the Patel story
2007 Walkley for Best Print New story, for the Mohamed Haneef story and Gold Walkey
2012 Queensland Clarion Award for Queensland Journalist of the Year for highlighting evidence overlooked by the judicial inquiry into the operation of the Wivenhoe Dam during the 2011 Queensland floods
 2012 received an Honorary Doctorate of Journalism from John Henningham's Jschool School of Journalism in Brisbane
2018 Gold Walkley for The Teachers Pet podcast
2022 Sir Keith Murdoch Award for The Teachers Pet podcast

Selected published works

References

External links
Hall of Fame Biography
Interview with Thomas

Living people
Year of birth missing (living people)
People from Brisbane
Walkley Award winners